Gabriela Gunčíková (born 27 June 1993), also known as Gabriela Gun, is a Czech singer.  Her singing voice has been described as a cross between Sheryl Crow and Ann Wilson from the band, Heart.  She was the runner-up of the second season of Česko Slovenská SuperStar and won the New Artist award at the 2011 Český slavík awards. Gunčíková was a touring vocalist of the Trans-Siberian Orchestra from 2014 until 2015. She represented the Czech Republic at the Eurovision Song Contest 2016 in Stockholm with "I Stand".

Life and career

2011–2015: SuperStar 2011 and work with Trans-Siberian Orchestra
In 2011, Gunčíková became a finalist on the second season of the Czech-Slovak version of Pop Idol, titled Česko Slovenská SuperStar. She ended up as the show's runner-up, placing behind the Slovak winner Lukáš Adamec. She was the highest placing Czech contestant during the season. Following the show's ending, she was signed to Universal Music Group and released her debut album Dvojí tvář later in the year. Gunčíková appeared on the fifth season of the Slovak version of Dancing with the Stars, Let's Dance, which began airing on 9 September 2011. She was paired with professional dancer Peter Modrovský until the dance couple was eliminated on 14 October 2011, finishing in seventh place. She became one of the highest placing Czech celebrities on the show. Gunčíková went on to win the New Artist award at the 2011 Český slavík awards, also known as the Czech Grammys.

Let's Dance
In 2011 she was part of Slovak dancing competition Let's Dance where she was paired with dancer and two-time champion Peter Modrovský.

In 2013, Gunčíková began working with American vocal coach Ken Tamplin. She released her second studio album Celkem jiná this year as well. She graduated from Tamplin's classes in 2014 and subsequently joined the American progressive rock band Trans-Siberian Orchestra as a touring vocalist. She departed from the band the following year.

2015–present: Eurovision Song Contest 2016
In March 2016, Gunčíková was announced as the Czech entrant to the Eurovision Song Contest 2016 with the song "I Stand". She competed in the second half of the first semi-final on 10 May 2016 in Stockholm, Sweden, and qualified for the grand final (she was the first Czech entrant to do so), where she performed second, and finished in 25th place.

Discography

Studio albums

Singles

Awards and nominations

References

External links

1993 births
Living people
21st-century Czech women singers
People from Kroměříž
Czech rock musicians
Eurovision Song Contest entrants for the Czech Republic
Eurovision Song Contest entrants of 2016
Czech pop singers
Universal Music Group artists
Trans-Siberian Orchestra members